Holy Trinity Monastery Church is the katholikon of the monastery of the Holy Trinity in Pepel, Gjirokastër County, Albania. It is declared as a Cultural Monument of Albania.

During the recent years the Orthodox Autocephalous Church of Albania undertook the renovation of the monastery and its katholikon.

References

Cultural Monuments of Albania
Buildings and structures in Dropull